Abdol Hossein Dastgheib (8 December 1913 -11 December 1981). He was appointed as Imam of Friday Prayer and one of the representatives of the Supreme Leader in Shiraz. He was a Mujtahidd, expert in Arabic language, theology, revealed texts, and the principles of jurisprudence (Usul al-fiqh). He was killed by the People's Mujahedin of Iran.

Biography
Dastgheib's father Seyed Mohammad Taqi, who taught elementary education, died when he was 11 or 12 years old. He continued his education after the death his father in Shiraz, then continued his education in Najaf. After returning to Iran, he commenced serious political activities.

Political activities

Before Iranian Revolution
He participated in a political struggle during Pahlavi dynasty. He was imprisoned for criticizing government policies and forced by the regime to leave Iran, returning in 1962. He supported Ruhollah Khomeini and continued to perform political activities against the regime. On June 5 1963, he was arrested and exiled to Tehran, and in 1964, he was again arrested and sent into exile. He was the leader of people of Shiraz in the struggle against the Pahlavi. In 1977, the regime placed him under house arrest but had to retreat for people's reaction. After people were massacred during public demonstrations in Shiraz against shah's regime, he was arrested.

After Iranian Revolution
He was appointed as Imam of Friday Prayer and representative of the Supreme Leader in Shiraz, and was a Mujtahidd who was expert in the Arabic language, theology, revealed texts, and the principles of jurisprudence (Usul al-fiqh). He was a representative of the people of Fars in the Assembly of Experts.

Mentors
Abu l-Hasan al-Isfahani
Agha Zia Addin Araghi
Ali Tabatabaei
Mohammad Kazem Shirazi (from a mentor of ethics and mysticism)
Mohammad Jawad Ansari Hamedani
Seyed Mirza Estahbahanati

Books
He authored the following books.

Everlasting heaven
Certain role 
Faith 
Resurrection 
Sermon of shabarieh 
Hosseini uprising 
Great sins 
Humble prayers 
Great Fatemeh Zahra and Zeinab 
Ascension to heaven 
Prophecy 
Heart of Quran
Introduction from the Quran
Another world 
Islamic behavior 
questions 
Secrecy of the Quran
Office of Imam (Imamate)
Truth from Quran
Eternity
Friday sermons
Pure heart 
Manners from the Quran
Unitarianism
Fantastic stories
Sayed-Ol-Shohada

Death
On 11 December 1981, Dastgheib and seven companions were killed in a bomb explosion as they were travelling to the mosque to lead Friday prayer.The People's Mujahedin of Iran claimed responsibility for the act.

Gallery

See also 
The Five Martyrs
Shahid Awwal
Shahid Thani
Shahid Salis
Shahid Rabay
Shahid Khamis
Muhammad al-Tijani

References

1860 births
1946 deaths
Iranian grand ayatollahs
Iranian emigrants to Iraq
Twelvers
People from Isfahan Province
Al-Moussawi family
Burials at Imam Ali Mosque
People assassinated by the People's Mojahedin Organization of Iran